The Zulia Metropolitan Zoo (also called the Zoological Park of Zulia or Parque del Sur) is a zoo established in 1973. It spans about 40 hectares and is located at kilometer 10 of the La Cañada highway in the municipality of San Francisco south of Maracaibo, the capital of Zulia in Venezuela. Its administration and management since 2008 is the responsibility of the Zulia state government.

The zoo faces constant problems such as drought and lack of resources in the area, which may effect species such as felines (leopards, lions, jaguars), rhinos, orangutans, among others.

Between 1973 and 1993 was controlled by the governorship of Zulia, a situation that was interrupted between that last year and 2008 when it was finally returned to its original administrators.

See also
List of national parks of Venezuela
Loefling Zoo

References

Zoos in Venezuela
Protected areas established in 1973
Buildings and structures in Maracaibo